Phung River may refer to several rivers in Thailand:

Lam Nam Phung, a feeder of Nong Han Lake in Sakon Nakhon Province
Nam Mae Phung, a tributary of the Ing River in Chiang Rai Province
Huai Nam Phung, a tributary of the Pa Sak River in Loei and Phetchabun Provinces